Ana María de Soto ( – after 1798), was a sailor in the Spanish military. She was the first woman to serve in the Marine Battalions.

Biography
Ana María de Soto was born in Aguilar de la Frontera, Córdoba. In 1793, at the age of sixteen, she posed as a man, using the name of Antonio María de Soto, and enlisted in the Navy Battalions. On 4 January 1794 she embarked on the frigate Mercedes. During her military life, she served as a soldier in the 6th Company of the 11th Marine Battalion, participating in the attack on Bañuls in Catalonia; in the defense and abandonment of Roses, Girona; in the Battle of Cape St Vincent; and in the gunboats of the Cádiz defense.

De Soto was discharged from the frigate Matilde on 7 July 1798, when it was discovered that she was a woman during a routine medical examination. On 24 July 1798, to honor her heroic behavior, the King granted De Soto a salary and sergeant's rank, so that she could attend to her parents. She was also authorized to use the colors of the naval battalions and sergeant badges on women's clothes. She was granted an absolute license on 1 August 1798.

References

Bibliography 
 
 

Spanish naval personnel
18th-century Spanish military personnel
People from Campiña Sur (Córdoba)
Women in 18th-century warfare
Female wartime cross-dressers
Year of birth uncertain
Year of death unknown
Spanish female military personnel